Malik Harrison (born March 5, 1998) is an American football inside linebacker for the Baltimore Ravens of the National Football League (NFL). He played college football at Ohio State and was drafted by the Ravens in the third round of the 2020 NFL Draft.

Early years
Harrison attended Walnut Ridge High School in Columbus, Ohio, where he played football and basketball. On the football field, he switched between quarterback, wide receiver, running back, linebacker, and safety. In 2015, his senior season, he rushed for 897 yards and 15 touchdowns while passing for 1,161 yards and eight touchdowns alongside compiling five sacks and forty tackles. He committed to play college football at Ohio State University following his senior season.

College career
In 2016, Harrison's freshman year at Ohio State, he appeared in 12 games. As a sophomore in 2017, he appeared in all 14 of Ohio State's games, compiling 36 tackles and two sacks.

In 2018, Harrison's junior season, he became a starter, and was tied for first on the team in tackles with 81 alongside adding 8.5 tackles for loss. He earned All-Big Ten Conference honorable mention.

Professional career

Baltimore Ravens
Harrison was drafted by the Baltimore Ravens in the third round (98th overall) of the 2020 NFL Draft. He signed his four-year rookie contract with the team on July 13, 2020. He was placed on the reserve/COVID-19 list by the team on November 3, 2020, and activated four days later.

Harrison suffered a non-life-threatening injury after being shot in the left calf during a gathering in Cleveland on October 31, 2021. He was placed on the reserve/non-football injury list the following day. He was activated on November 27, 2021.

References

External links
Ohio State Buckeyes bio

1998 births
Living people
Players of American football from Columbus, Ohio
American football linebackers
Ohio State Buckeyes football players
Baltimore Ravens players